The 1907 Miami Redskins football team was an American football team that represented Miami University during the 1907 college football season. Led by coach Amos Foster in his first year, Miami compiled a 6–1 record, shutting out four opponents and outscoring them 120 to 37.

Schedule

Roster

Notes

References

Miami
Miami RedHawks football seasons
Miami Redskins football